Eight ships of the Royal Navy have borne the name HMS Jackal (or Jackall), after the predatory mammal, the jackal:

  was a 10-gun cutter purchased in 1778 and sold in 1785.
  was a 14-gun cutter purchased in 1779. Later in 1779 eighteen Irish men of her crew mutinied and sailed her to Calais where they sold her for £3,000. She became the French privateer Jackall, Chacal, or Boulogne.  recaptured Boullongue on 22 July 1781. She became a privateer.
  was a 10-gun brig. She was a purchased vessel in service in 1792.
  was a 12-gun gun-brig launched in 1801 and wrecked on the French coast in 1807; crew taken into captivity.
  was an iron paddle gunvessel launched in 1844 and sold in 1887.
She was renamed HMS Jackal in 1886 and was sold in 1906.
  was an  launched in 1911 and sold in 1920.
  was a J-class destroyer launched in 1938 and sunk in 1942.

Citations

References

Royal Navy ship names